These are the individual player statistics for the 2004 World Cup of Hockey.

Canada
Note: GP = Games Played, G = Goals, A = Assists, Pts = Points, PIM = Penalty Minutes

Czech Republic
Note: GP = Games Played, G = Goals, A = Assists, Pts = Points, PIM = Penalty Minutes

Germany
Note: GP = Games Played, G = Goals, A = Assists, Pts = Points, PIM = Penalty Minutes

Finland
Note: GP = Games Played, G = Goals, A = Assists, Pts = Points, PIM = Penalty Minutes

Russia
Note: GP = Games Played, G = Goals, A = Assists, Pts = Points, PIM = Penalty Minutes

Slovakia
Note: GP = Games Played, G = Goals, A = Assists, Pts = Points, PIM = Penalty Minutes

Sweden
Note: GP = Games Played, G = Goals, A = Assists, Pts = Points, PIM = Penalty Minutes

United States
Note: GP = Games Played, G = Goals, A = Assists, Pts = Points, PIM = Penalty Minutes

Goalies
Note: W = Wins, L = Losses, T = Ties, GAA = Goals Against Average, SPCT = Save Percentage

References
The Hockey News Volume 58 Issue No. 5.

Statistics
Ice hockey statistics